{{multiple image
| align = right
| image1 = PhilipIIGoldStaterHeadOfApollo.jpg
| width1 = 200
| alt1 = 
| caption1 = The obverse of a gold philippeios, with (short-haired) Apollo.
| image2 = Gaul imitation stater Philip II CdM Paris.jpg
| width2 = 200
| alt2 = 
| caption2 = A Gaulish stater imitating the philippeios design
| footer = 
}}Philippeioi (Philíppeioi), later called Alexanders''' (Ἀλέξανδροι, Aléxandroi), were the gold coins used in the ancient Greek Kingdom of Macedonia. First issued at some point between 355 and 347 BC, the coins featured a portrait of the Greek deity Apollo on the obverse, and on the reverse, an illustration of a biga, a Greek chariot drawn by two horses. They had the value of one gold stater each. In the first issuing, Apollo was depicted with long hair, but after that the design was altered permanently to one in which Apollo's hair was shorter. 

The coins were intended primarily for large purchases outside of Macedonia. As a result, they spread quickly, first to the Balkans and continental Greece, and eventually throughout the Western world of the time; stashes of philippeioi have been uncovered in Italy, Constantinople, Southern Russia, Cyprus, Syria, and Egypt. The vast majority of these were actually struck by Philip's successor, Alexander the Great. The philippeioi issued by Alexander after Philip's death continued to use that name officially, though they were often called "alexanders" by Alexander's supporters.

Influence
Considered the most famous coins to be struck by king Philip II, the philippeioi continued to be highly influential even after they were no longer in circulation. Their design was widely mimicked or replicated by currencies outside of Greece, even long after the philippeioi themselves were no longer in circulation. The Gaulish gold staters, whose design closely mimicked that of the philippeioi, continued to be minted up until the end of the Gallic Wars three centuries later (51 BC). In many cases, the design of the coins changed as it was appropriated by cultures outside of Greece; in some Gaulish imitations, Apollo's hair became large and stylized, while the chariot was often reduced to a single horse (sometimes sporting a humanoid head), with the remaining space occupied by Celtic symbols such as a sun cross, the head of a boar, or a depiction of the sun god Ogmios. The coins were so widespread that in many ancient Roman texts, the word philippeioi'' is used generically, to refer to any heavy gold coins.

References

External links

Ancient Macedonian coins, Numismatic Museum of Athens

Coins of ancient Greece
Gold coins
Macedonia (ancient kingdom)
Alexander the Great
Philip II of Macedon